Baklan Point (‘Nos Baklan’ \'nos ba-'klan\) is the rocky east entrance point of Argonavt Cove on the north coast of Nelson Island in the South Shetland Islands, Antarctica projecting 450 m northwards. The area was visited by early 19th century sealers.

The point is “named after the ocean fishing trawler Baklan of the Bulgarian company Ocean Fisheries – Burgas whose ships operated in the waters of South Georgia, Kerguelen, the South Orkney Islands, South Shetland Islands and Antarctic Peninsula from 1970 to the early 1990s.  The Bulgarian fishermen, along with those of the Soviet Union, Poland and East Germany are the pioneers of modern Antarctic fishing industry.”

Location
British mapping in 1968.

Maps
 Livingston Island to King George Island.  Scale 1:200000. Admiralty Nautical Chart 1776. Taunton: UK Hydrographic Office, 1968.
 South Shetland Islands. Scale 1:200000 topographic map No. 3373. DOS 610 - W 62 58. Tolworth, UK, 1968.
 Antarctic Digital Database (ADD). Scale 1:250000 topographic map of Antarctica. Scientific Committee on Antarctic Research (SCAR). Since 1993, regularly upgraded and updated.

Notes

References
 Baklan Point. SCAR Composite Gazetteer of Antarctica
 Bulgarian Antarctic Gazetteer. Antarctic Place-names Commission. (details in Bulgarian, basic data in English)

External links
 Baklan Point. Copernix satellite image

Headlands of the South Shetland Islands
Ocean Fisheries – Burgas Co 
Bulgaria and the Antarctic